East Lindsey is a local government district in Lincolnshire, England. The population of the district council was 142,300 at the 2021 census. The council is based in Horncastle having moved from its former headquarters at Manby in December 2022. Other major settlements in the district include Alford, Wragby, Spilsby, Mablethorpe, Skegness, Horncastle, Chapel St Leonards, Louth and Woodhall Spa. Skegness is the largest town in East Lindsey, followed by Louth.

Political representation

The political composition of East Lindsey District Council is as follows:

With a total of 55 seats, the Conservatives hold a 7-seat majority, following the defection of two councillors (David Mangion and Sarah Parkin) to the Conservatives in 2020.

Geography
East Lindsey has an area of 1,760 km2, making it the fifth-largest district (and second-largest non-unitary district) in England. It was formed on 1 April 1974, under the Local Government Act 1972, from the south-eastern area of the former administrative county of Lindsey. It was a merger of the Municipal Borough of Louth with the Alford, Horncastle, Mablethorpe and Sutton, Skegness and Woodhall Spa urban districts, and the rural districts of Horncastle, Louth and Spilsby, all formerly in the administrative county of Lindsey.

It borders North Lincolnshire and North East Lincolnshire to the North, the North Sea to the east, Boston (borough) to the south, and North Kesteven and West Lindsey, to the west. The boundary between the district and North Kesteven, and part of Boston borough, is the River Witham. The furthest west settlement in the district is Wragby, and the furthest south is Frith Bank, around three miles from Boston.

The Lincolnshire Wolds AONB run north-south through the central and northern reaches of the district. To the east along the North Sea coast lies the Lincolnshire Marsh, with the Fens to the south and south-west. 

Along the boundary with West Lindsey to the west can be found the Lincolnshire Lime Woods. 

It is bigger than many English counties. On the list of largest counties, it compares to the 29th largest county, being larger than counties such as Surrey, Berkshire, Worcestershire, Bedfordshire, Greater London and Hertfordshire.

Economy
The economy in the district is divided between the coast and rural inland areas. The coastal towns of Mablethorpe and Skegness attract recreational and tourist traffic, and are characterised by a highly seasonal economy. The rural inland areas are dominated by agriculture.

In terms of transport, the district is well served by buses and taxis. However, it is mostly cut off from the main railway network. Only the Poacher Line connects the south end from Skegness to Nottingham via Boston and Grantham. The main connection in East Lindsey was the East Lincolnshire Railway, which connected Boston to Grimsby via Alford and Louth. There were also spurs and branch lines, which included Mablethorpe loop railway, Horncastle Railway and Spilsby branch. These connected sparse towns with the mainline and all closed between 1950 and 1970, with only the spur at Louth to Grimsby surviving until 1981. Only a heritage railway remains at Ludborough.

Environment
East Lindsey District Council had a high rate of residential recycling; it was the UK's best performer in Defra's local authority and disposal authority 2007/8 statistics, with a Household Recycling and Composting Rate of 58.4%.

In 2013 councillors voted to introduce a charge to garden waste collections of £25 per year. This was met with controversy both by residents and councillors, becoming council policy by a majority of only one vote. Councillor Neil Cooper stated "The green waste charge is probably as popular as the introduction of poll tax" and in a public consultation of 1,120 respondents, 77% stated they did not wish to pay the charge.

A Freedom of Information Request submitted in June 2014 confirmed significant drops in rates of green waste recycling, for the period April–May 2013 compared with April–May 2014 a drop of almost 400 tonnes was recorded; whilst at the same time an increase in domestic waste collected was recorded of over 380 tonnes.

Transport 
East Lindsey is highly rural and contains no dual-carriageways worthy of the name, with the only rail in the district in the south-east running from Boston to Skegness. The A158 runs east-west from Lincoln, entering the district at Wragby, passing Horncastle and near by Spilsby, before terminating in Skegness. The A16 runs from Boston to the south, though Spilsby and Louth, and then on to Grimsby.

Education

East Lindsey has two of the best state schools in the East Midlands, but it also has the worst one, as judged by results. St Clements College, a secondary modern school in Skegness, got the lowest GCSEs in 2007 in the East Midlands.

Merger proposal 
In May 2020, East Lindsey district council and Boston borough council announced proposals to merge gradually over 10 years, with the intention of saving taxpayers £15.4 million.  In June 2020, a vote on the proposals due to be put to councillors was cancelled after the leader of Boston borough council, Paul Skinner, considered the plans would be likely rejected.  He told the Lincolnshire Live newspaper "The motion was withdrawn because some people were making it known that they might vote against it".

References

External links

 
Non-metropolitan districts of Lincolnshire
Local government districts of the East Midlands